Françoise Bonnet (born 8 April 1957 in Montluçon, Allier) is a retired female long-distance runner from France. She set her personal best (2:31:20) in the marathon in 1990.

Achievements

References
 

1957 births
Living people
French female long-distance runners
Olympic athletes of France
Athletes (track and field) at the 1988 Summer Olympics
People from Montluçon
Sportspeople from Allier